Sharmiela Mandre (born 28 October 1990) is an Indian actress and producer who primarily works in Kannada films. She made her acting debut with Sajni (2007) and then received success with Krishna, the same year. Mandre turned producer with the Tamil film Evanukku Engeyo Matcham Irukku (2018). 

Post her debut, she received praises for the Kannada films Venkata in Sankata (2009) and Swayamvara (2010). She made her Tamil debut with Mirattal (2012) and Telugu debut with Kevvu Keka (2013). For the latter, she received SIIMA Award for Best Female Debut – Telugu nomination. Mandre's other notable work include Aake (2017) and Gaalipata 2 (2022).

Early life and background
Mandre was born on 28 October 1990 in Bangalore, Karnataka. Her father Dayananda Mandre is a businessman and a car-racing enthusiast. Her grandfather Ramananda Narayanrao Mandre was a film producer, distributor and the founder of Sangam Talkies, Bangalore. Mandre's paternal aunt Sunanda Murali Manohar, was a film producer. She completed her schooling from Sophia High School, Bangalore.

Personal life
Mandre changed her name from Sharmila Mandre to Sharmiela Mandre in 2013, adding an extra "e" to her name. She termed it as a personal choice.

In 2020, Mandre suffered injuries after the car that she was travelling crashed against a pillar in Bengaluru.

Career

Debut and early success (2007-2011)
Mandre made her film debut with Sajni in 2007, which was produced by her aunt Sunanda Murali Manohar. She portrayed a college student opposite Dhyan. Rediff.com noted, "Newcomer Sharmila rocks and has a bright future ahead for her." She had her first commercial success with the film Krishna opposite Ganesh. Rediff.com mentioned, "Sharmila, in her second film, proves that she is talented." Ee Bandhana was her final release of the year. In 2008, she appeared opposite Darshan in Navagraha and played a special role in Mast Maja Maadi.

She had two releases in 2009. She first appeared opposite Sriimurali in Shivamani. She then appeared in Venkata in Sankata alongside Devadas Kapikad and Ramesh Aravind. Rediff.com stated, "Sharmila Mandre manages to look pleasing on screen." In 2010, she first appeared opposite Diganth in Swayamvara. Deccan Herald said, "Sharmila is restrained and oozing glamour wherever required." She then appeared in Kari Chirathe opposite Duniya Vijay. In 2011, she appeared opposite Prem Kumar in Dhan Dhana Dhan.

Career expansion (2012-2017)
Mandre made her Tamil film debut with Mirattal, a remake of the Telugu film Dhee. She appeared opposite Vinay. She received positive critics review for her performance. In 2013, she made her Telugu film debut with Kevvu Keka opposite Allari Naresh. Times of India said, "Sharmeila Mandre's role makes for an enjoyable character." She received SIIMA Award for Best Female Debut – Telugu  nomination for her performance.

Mandre appeared opposite Tarun Chandra in Goa. Times of India noted, "Sharmiela Mandre steals the show with a graceful performance." In December 2014, it was announced that she was selected to play the protagonist in the Khalid Mohammed's directorial Katha, a remake of 1983 film of the same name, reprising Deepti Naval's role. But the film got scrapped. In 2015, she portrayed the titular role in Mumtaz, opposite Dharma Keerthiraj. It was a commercial success. The New Indian Express wrote, "Sharmiela Mandre looks pretty but does not bring any depth."

Mandre had two releases in 2017. She appeared opposite Chiranjeevi Sarja in Aake, a remake of Tamil film Maya (2015), playing a single mother. Deccan Chronicle noted, "Sharmiela Mandre 'scares' with her top-notch acting and the rest revolves around her." While, The News Minute stated, "Sharmiela Mandre is shining on screen." In the same year, she also portrayed a journalist in Shivarajkumar's Leader. She learned belly dancing for her role in the film.

Hiatus and recent work (2018-present)
Mandre took a hiatus of 4 years, from acting due to her production work. She made her screen comeback with Gaalipata 2 in 2022. She portrayed a teacher opposite Pawan Kumar. The Hindu mentioned, "Sharmila Mandre justify her character." The film was a commercial success.

Mandre will next appear in Mandala: The UFO Incident, alongside Anant Nag and Prakash Belawadi. She also has her productions Dasara with Sathish Ninasam in her kitty.

Other work and media image
Mandre started her own production house named Sharmiela Mandre Productions, in 2018. She has produced Tamil films Evanukku Engeyo Matcham Irukku (2018) and Naanum Single Thaan under her production house. She will next produce the upcoming films, which include the Tamil films Sandakkari and Kaadhal Konjam Thookala, and the Kannada film Dasara, in which she stars too.

Mandre ranked 10th in 2012 and 8th in 2014 in Bangalore Times' 25 Most Desirable Women List. In its 30 Most Desirable Women List of 2020, she ranked 20th.

Filmography

As actor
All films are in Kannada, unless otherwise noted.

As producer

Awards and nominations

See also
 List of Kannada film actresses

References

External links
 

Indian film actresses
Living people
Actresses in Kannada cinema
1990 births
Actresses from Bangalore
Actresses in Telugu cinema
Actresses in Hindi cinema
21st-century Indian actresses
Mount Carmel College, Bangalore alumni